DoggoLingo is an Internet language that is created from word conversion, meme lexicon, and onomatopoeia. Emerging in the 2010s, DoggoLingo is implied to be a dog's own idiom, and is presented as what humans have long believed goes on in the canine brain. Elyse Graham, assistant professor at Stony Brook University, describes DoggoLingo as "upbeat, joyful, and clueless in a relentlessly friendly way".

Structure 
DoggoLingo appends various diminutive suffixes "-o", "-er", "-ino" to existing English words (e.g. dog turns into doggo, pup turns into pupper) as well as DoggoLingo words that have been created (e.g. pupper turns into pupperino, bork turns into borker). DoggoLingo relies heavily upon onomatopoeia: Words such as blep, blop, gwelp and mlem describe the action of a dog sticking out its tongue, or other forms of facial expression; bork, boof, woof describe the various canine barking sounds. A dog with a fluffy coat may be called a floof or a fluff. DoggoLingo follows a similar rudimentary style to create its verbs (e.g. doin me a in place of present participles with the speaker as object, such as doin me a scare "scaring me") and adjectives (e.g. heckin in place of degree modifiers such as extremely). 'Heck' is frequently used in place of more conventional expletives. Some words also come from eye dialect spellings of English words, such as fren "friend".

Origin 
DoggoLingo emerged in the 2010s, but its exact origin is unknown. Various social media accounts such as WeRateDogs on Twitter and Dogspotting on Facebook, as well as social news aggregation and imageboard websites like 4chan, Reddit, or Tumblr have aided in popularizing the use of DoggoLingo by consistently using or hosting content that uses the lingo on their Internet pages. In 2014, the Dogspotting Facebook account gained popularity, especially in Australia where coincidentally adding "-o" to the end of words is also a feature of Australian slang. Usage of DoggoLingo peaked around 2017.

Linguist Gretchen McCulloch characterized the language as "taking on characteristics of how people would address their animals in the first place", and noted that it was used by people talking as themselves online, in contrast to the mid-2000s lolcat trend where images of cats were captioned as if the cat were speaking.

Examples

Other animals 
Many other animals are referred to differently in DoggoLingo: for example, one would refer to a snake as snek or danger noodle, a human being as hooman, a cat as catto (cf. doggo), a bird as birb, and a bee as a spicy sky raisin.

See also 

 Pig Latin

References

Note

Citations

Internet memes
Internet slang
Dogs in popular culture
2010s fads and trends